Pilioritikos is a kind of a Greek folk dance from Pilio, (Thessaly), Greece.

See also
Music of Greece
Greek dances

References
Πηλιορίτικος xoρόs

Greek dances